Félix Veronique Denayer (born 31 January 1990) is a Belgian field hockey player who plays as a midfielder for Dragons and the Belgium national team.

Denayer combines his sport with studies at the University of Antwerp.

International career
Denayer competed for the national team at the 2008, 2012 and 2016 Olympics, winning a silver medal at the Rio Olympics. With Belgium he won the silver medal at the 2013 European Championship on home ground in Boom, and again at the 2017 European Championships in Amsterdam.  He also tasted World Cup success with Belgium in 2018. In 2019, he was a part of the squad which won Belgium its first European title. On 25 May 2021, he was selected in the squad for the 2021 EuroHockey Championship. He was the captain of the Belgian team which won the gold medal at the 2020 Summer Olympics.

Honours

International
Belgium
Olympic gold medal: 2020
World Cup: 2018
EuroHockey Championship: 2019
FIH Pro League: 2020–21

Club
Dragons
Belgian Hockey League: 2009–10, 2010–11, 2014–15, 2015–16, 2016–17, 2017–18, 2020–21

References

External links
 
 
 
 

1990 births
Living people
People from Edegem
Belgian male field hockey players
Male field hockey midfielders
Field hockey players at the 2008 Summer Olympics
Field hockey players at the 2012 Summer Olympics
2014 Men's Hockey World Cup players
Field hockey players at the 2016 Summer Olympics
Field hockey players at the 2020 Summer Olympics
2018 Men's Hockey World Cup players
Olympic field hockey players of Belgium
Olympic silver medalists for Belgium
Olympic medalists in field hockey
Medalists at the 2016 Summer Olympics
KHC Dragons players
Men's Belgian Hockey League players
Olympic gold medalists for Belgium
Medalists at the 2020 Summer Olympics
Sportspeople from Antwerp Province
2023 Men's FIH Hockey World Cup players
20th-century Belgian people
21st-century Belgian people